Stanley Ma (born in Hong Kong in 1950) is a Canadian businessman and founder and President of MTY Food Group that owns a wide variety of food brands and sells fast food chain outlets. In 2011, it had 1600 restaurants and fast food stores in Canada and 140 mainly in the Middle East, the Persian Gulf region and North Africa.

Career 
Ma was born in a family with manufacturing, real estate, and retail sale businesses in Hong Kong. He immigrated to Canada in 1968 and established himself in Montreal. In 1979, he opened his first restaurant in Laval, Quebec called Le Paradis du Pacifique that served a Polynesian menu. In 1983, he launched his chain of Chinese food under the brand name Tiki Ming in Montreal.

In 1997, he founded MTY Food Group and serves as its CEO. In a close-knit family, his son David, an architect, is projects manager, and his daughter Katherine is in sales. MTY engages in a very active series of acquisitions of key brands in Quebec and all over Canada.

In 2011, MTY has the following enterprises / franchises amongst others: Tiki-Ming (Chinese cuisine), Thaï Express (Thai cuisine), Sushi Shop (sushi specialties), Sukiyaki (Japanese cuisine), Au Vieux Duluth Express (Greek cuisine), Vanelli's (Italian cuisine), La Crémière (frozen milk products), Tandori (Indian cuisine), Franx Supreme (hot dogs, Poutines), Cultures (sandwiches and salads), CaféRama, O'Burger, Vie & Nam (Vietnamese cuisine), Chick'n'Chik, Croissant Plus, Kim Chi (Korean cuisine), Koya Japan (Japanese cuisine), Panini (Italian cuisine), Villa Madina (Arab and Mediterranean food), Yogen Früz (yogurt products), and Taco Time (Mexican cuisine).

Ma was named the 2010 Ernst & Young Quebec Region Entrepreneur of the Year Award and Business-to-consumer products and services category award winner.

References

External links
MTY Group website

Canadian businesspeople
1950 births
Living people
Hong Kong emigrants to Canada